Many languages have words expressing indefinite and fictitious numbers—inexact terms of indefinite size, used for comic effect, for exaggeration, as placeholder names, or when precision is unnecessary or undesirable. One technical term for such words is "non-numerical vague quantifier". Such words designed to indicate large quantities can be called "indefinite hyperbolic numerals".

Specific values used as indefinite 

 In English, some words that have a precise numerical definition are often used indefinitely: couple, 2; dozen, 12; score, 20; myriad, 10,000. Unlike cardinal numbers these can be pluralized, in which case they require of before the noun (millions of dollars, but five million dollars) and require the indefinite article "a" in the singular (a million letters (indefinite) but one million letters (definite)). "Eleventy" (or "eleventy-seven"), popularized by The Lord of the Rings, is derived from an Old English word for 110 but is more commonly used as an indefinite number.
 In various Middle Eastern traditions, the number 40 is used to express a large but unspecific number, as in the Hebrew Bible's "forty days and forty nights", Ali Baba and the Forty Thieves, and the Forty Martyrs of Sebaste. This usage is sometimes found in English as well (for example, "forty winks").
 In Latin,  (600) was used to mean a very large number, perhaps from the size of a Roman cohort. English million derives from indefinite use of the Latin word for thousand, . 
 In Arabic, 1001 is used similarly, as in The Book of One Thousand and One Nights (lit. "a thousand nights and one night"). Many modern English book titles use this convention as well: 1,001 Uses for ....
 In Irish, 100,000 (céad míle) is used, as in the phrase céad míle fáilte, "a hundred thousand welcomes" or Gabriel Rosenstock's poetic phrase  ("my hundred thousand loves").
 In Welsh, cant a mil, literally "a hundred and thousand", is used to mean a large number in a similar way to English "a hundred and one". It is used in phrases such as cant a mil o bethau i'w wneud "a hundred and one things to do" i.e. "many, many things to do".
 In Chinese, 108,000 li, means a great distance.
 In Thai, ร้อยแปด (roi paed) means both 108 and miscellaneous, various, plentiful.
 In Hungarian, people often say "26 times" for expressing their impatience or dissatisfaction about a recurring act (for example, "26 times I told you that I know Peter!"). "Csilliárd" is also often used in the same "indefinitely large number" meaning as "zillion" in English. Probably humorous merging of words "csillag" ("star", referring to the large number of stars) and "milliárd" ("billion", cf. long scale).

Umpteen 

Umpteen, umteen or umpty is an unspecified but large number, used in a humorous fashion or to imply that it is not worth the effort to pin down the actual figure. Despite the -teen ending, which would seem to indicate that it lies between 12 and 20, umpteen can be much larger.

"Umpty" is first attested in 1905, in the expression "umpty-seven", implying that it is a multiple of ten. Ump(ty) came from a verbalization of a dash in Morse code.

"Umpteen", adding the ending -teen, as in "thirteen", is first attested in 1918, and has become by far the most common form.

In Norwegian, ørten is used in a similar way, playing on the numbers from tretten (13) to nitten (19), but often signifying a much larger number.

-illion

Words with the suffix -illion (e.g. zillion, gazillion, bazillion, jillion, bajillion, squillion, and others) are often used as informal names for unspecified large numbers by analogy to names of large numbers such as million (106), billion (109) and trillion (1012). In Estonian, the compound word mustmiljon ("black million") is used to mean an unfathomably large number.

These words are intended to denote a number that is large enough to be unfathomable and are typically used as hyperbole or for comic effect. They have no precise value or order. They form ordinals and fractions with the usual suffix -th, e.g. "I asked her for the jillionth time", or "-illionaire" to describe a wealthy person.

Other
A "sagan" or "sagan unit" is a facetious name for a very large number inspired by Carl Sagan's association with the phrase "billions and billions". It is not to be confused with Sagan's number, the number of stars in the observable universe.

See also 

 List of unusual units of measurement
 List of humorous units of measurement
 Large numbers
 Names of large numbers
 1000 percent
 It's Over 9000!

References

Large numbers

de:Zahlennamen#Zillion